Geoffrey Stevens (born 1940) is a Canadian journalist, author and educator.

Born in London, Ontario, Stevens was a longtime Ottawa columnist for The Globe and Mail and later became the paper's managing editor. He also served in the same position at Maclean's magazine.

He has authored books on Canadian politics, but rose to greater national fame with his 2003 biography of noted Progressive Conservative organizer Dalton Camp, entitled, The Player: The Life and Times of Dalton Camp. Stevens was awarded the Drainie-Taylor Biography Prize by the Writers' Trust of Canada for The Player in 2004. His 2021 book is a biography of politician Flora MacDonald.

Stevens currently lives in Cambridge, Ontario where he is a weekly columnist for The Record of Waterloo Region and the Guelph Mercury while also teaching political science courses at the University of Guelph and Wilfrid Laurier University. He also writes for Canadian online media site rabble.ca. In June 2007, Stevens was awarded an honorary Doctor of Letters degree by Laurier for his
"unique and outstanding lifelong contribution to political reporting and public discourse across Canada."

Publications
 Stanfield. Toronto: McClelland and Stewart, 1973.
 Leaders & Lesser Mortals: Backroom Politics in Canada (with John Laschinger). Toronto: Key Porter Books, 1992.
 No Holds Barred: My Life in Politics (with John Crosbie). Toronto: McClelland & Stewart, 1997.
 The Player: The Life and Times of Dalton Camp. Toronto: Key Porter Books, 2003.

References

1942 births
Canadian newspaper journalists
Canadian male journalists
Journalists from Ontario
Living people
People from London, Ontario